Acleisson Scaion (born May 21, 1982) is a Brazilian football player.

Playing career
Acleisson played professionally for Associação Portuguesa de Desportos, appearing in the Campeonato Brasileiro Série B for two seasons, before joining former manager Vagner Benazzi at Avaí FC where he played in the Campeonato Brasileiro Série A.

Acleisson played for J2 League club; Thespakusatsu Gunma in 2015 season.

References

External links

1982 births
Living people
Brazilian footballers
Brazilian expatriate footballers
J2 League players
Thespakusatsu Gunma players
Avaí FC players
Clube Atlético Bragantino players
Mirassol Futebol Clube players
Associação Ferroviária de Esportes players
Associação Portuguesa de Desportos players
Expatriate footballers in Armenia
Expatriate footballers in Japan
Association football midfielders